Ngākuta Bay is a settlement and bay in the Marlborough Sounds, New Zealand. The bay is part of Grove Arm in Queen Charlotte Sound / Tōtaranui. Picton is about 11 km to the southeast via Queen Charlotte Drive. The bay was given its official name of Ngākuta Bay on 27 May 2021 and it has been known as Ngakuta Bay since at least 1865.

Naming
Ngākuta is a combination of the Te Reo Māori words ngā, meaning plural "the", and kuta, a name for the tall spike sedge Eleocharis sphacelata. Together ngākuta means "the tall spike sedges".

Demographics 

Ngākuta Bay had a population of 57 at the 2018 New Zealand census, a decrease of 6 people (-9.5%) since the 2013 census, and a decrease of 3 people (-5.0%) since the 2006 census. There were 33 households. There were 24 males and 33 females, giving a sex ratio of 0.73 males per female. The median age was 68 years (compared with 37.4 years nationally), with 3 people (5.3%) aged under 15 years, 6 (10.5%) aged 15 to 29, 15 (26.3%) aged 30 to 64, and 33 (57.9%) aged 65 or older.

Ethnicities were 94.7% European/Pākehā and 5.3% Māori.

Although some people objected to giving their religion, 47.4% had no religion and 42.1% were Christian.

Of those at least 15 years old, 12 (22.2%) people had a bachelor or higher degree, and 9 (16.7%) people had no formal qualifications. The median income was $26,700, compared with $31,800 nationally. The employment status of those at least 15 was that 15 (27.8%) people were employed full-time and 9 (16.7%) were part-time.

References 

Populated places in the Marlborough Region
Marlborough Sounds
Populated places in the Marlborough Sounds